Hampton is a city in southwestern Henry County, Georgia, United States. As of the 2010 census, the city had a population of 6,987, up from 3,857 at the 2000 census. By 2018 the estimated population was 7,922. "Hampton" mailing addresses outside the city limits reach into rural parts of eastern Clayton County and northern Spalding County. It is a southeastern suburb in the Atlanta metropolitan area.

History
The city was once known as "Bear Creek" or "Bear Creek Station", named after a creek that runs through the area. The town was moved, established and renamed in 1873 when the Central Railroad of Georgia was built approx. one mile to the east. It was named after Brig. General Wade Hampton, an American soldier in the Revolutionary War and War of 1812.

Points of interest
The Atlanta Air Route Traffic Control Center, the Federal Aviation Administration's ARTCC for the airspace over Atlanta and other parts of the Southeast U.S., is located in Hampton.

Geography
Hampton is located in southwestern Henry County at  (33.381522, -84.289573). 

U.S. Route 19/41, a four-lane highway, runs through the western side of the city, leading north  to downtown Atlanta and south  to Griffin.

Major highways
 U.S. Route 19
 U.S. Route 41
 State Route 3
 State Route 20
 State Route 81

Demographics

2020 census

As of the 2020 United States census, there were 8,368 people, 2,434 households, and 1,857 families residing in the city.

2000 census
As of the census of 2000, there were 3,857 people, 1,411 households, and 1,049 families living in the city. The racial makeup of the city was 84.16% White, 13.38% African American, 0.16% Native American, 0.67% Asian, 0.57% from other races, and 1.06% from two or more races. Hispanic or Latino of any race were 1.74% of the population.

There were 1,411 households, out of which 41.0% had children under the age of 18 living with them, 55.3% were married couples living together, 14.7% had a female householder with no husband present, and 25.6% were non-families. 19.6% of all households were made up of individuals, and 6.9% had someone living alone who was 65 years of age or older.  The average household size was 2.73 and the average family size was 3.12.

In the city, the population was spread out, with 29.8% under the age of 18, 8.8% from 18 to 24, 35.4% from 25 to 44, 17.0% from 45 to 64, and 8.9% who were 65 years of age or older.  The median age was 31 years. For every 100 females, there were 92.4 males.  For every 100 females age 18 and over, there were 88.7 males.

The median income for a household in the city was $46,094, and the median income for a family was $48,310. Males had a median income of $37,750 versus $25,286 for females. The per capita income for the city was $18,924.  About 2.1% of families and 5.0% of the population were below the poverty line, including 1.8% of those under age 18 and 14.6% of those age 65 or over.

Schools

Public

Elementary
Hampton Elementary School
Mt. Carmel Elementary School
Rocky Creek Elementary School

Middle
Hampton Middle School

High
 Hampton High School
 Dutchtown High School

References

External links

Cities in Georgia (U.S. state)
Cities in Henry County, Georgia